W31EZ-D, virtual channel 25 (UHF digital channel 31), is a low-powered HSN-affiliated television station licensed to Chicago, Illinois, United States. The station is owned by HC2 Holdings.

History 
The station’s construction permit was issued on October 7, 1992 under the calls of W52BR. It changed to W25DW on July 7, 2008, to W25DW-D on March 8, 2011, and to W31EZ-D on October 27, 2020.

The station was silent due to construction of the shared channel 31 facility, administered by WESV-LD; the two stations are sharing to resolve a mutual exclusivity in their applications.

Digital channels
The station's digital signal is multiplexed:

References 

Low-power television stations in the United States
Innovate Corp.
Television stations in Illinois
Television channels and stations established in 1992
1992 establishments in Illinois